Peter Grahame Snow (11 November 1934 – 28 February 2006) was a New Zealand general practitioner. He served the rural community of Tapanui for over 30 years. He was president of the Royal New Zealand College of GPs from 1998–99 and received their highest honour, Distinguished Fellowship, in 2001. He was a member of the Otago Hospital Board and its successor, the Otago District Health Board.

Education
As a boy, Snow attended Auckland Grammar School, graduating with the class of 1948.

While training in medicine he intended to become a surgeon, but was unable to do so because he wore glasses to correct his eyesight, so he took up general practice in Tapanui.

Practice
In 1984 he was presented with a number of patients with a prolonged exertional 'flu-like illness, but presenting no diagnosable condition.  While some people thought they were no different from commonly found "tired all the time" cases, Dr Snow was convinced that they were indeed sick and proceeded to investigate. Many were sheep farmers who previously had a perfect record of health.  Observing a similarity between the symptoms of stock suffering from selenium deficiency and these patients, he was the first doctor in New Zealand to identify the disease which turned out to be an outbreak of myalgic encephalomyelitis, now classed as chronic fatigue syndrome. Owing to, often disparaging, publicity surrounding these discoveries and a study into them by Snow, Marion Poore, and Charlotte Paul, the illness came to be known in New Zealand as "Tapanui flu" after the town of the same name in West Otago.

Snow also became concerned at the number of farmers injured in farm accidents, particularly those involving motorcycles, and made recommendations for improving farm safety. He campaigned unsuccessfully to prevent the closure of the Tapanui hospital, at which he was on call 24 hours a day, seven days a week.

Retirement, death and legacy
After more than 30 years in Tapanui, Snow and his wife retired to Lake Hayes. Peter Snow died on 28 February 2006. A memorial to Snow, comprising a moon rock and plaque, was unveiled in the main street of Tapanui on 8 August 2009. The moon rock was chosen because of Snow's belief that a meteor had collided with the moon in 1766 and dispersed debris across West Otago.

References

1934 births
2006 deaths
People educated at Auckland Grammar School
New Zealand general practitioners
Otago District Health Board members